The 2005 Kilkenny Senior Hurling Championship was the 111th staging of the Kilkenny Senior Hurling Championship since its establishment by the Kilkenny County Board.

James Stephens were the defending champions.

On 2 October 2005, Glenmore were relegated after a 2–11 to 0–15 defeat by Fenians.

On 23 October 2005, James Stephens won the title after a 1–18 to 2–12 defeat of Ballyhale Shamrocks in the final at Nowlan Park. It was their eighth championship title overall and their second title in succession.

Eoin Larkin from the James Stephens club was the championship's top scorer with 0-25.

Team changes

To Championship

Promoted from the Kilkenny Intermediate Hurling Championship
 Carrickshock

From Championship

Relegated to the Kilkenny Intermediate Hurling Championship
 Dicksboro

Results

First round

Relegation play-off

Quarter-finals

Semi-finals

Final

Championship statistics

Top scorers

Top scorers overall

Top scorers in a single game

References

Kilkenny Senior Hurling Championship
Kilkenny Senior Hurling Championship